Cornelius Johannes Petrus Gerthardus van Zyl (born 1 October 1961 in Bloemfontein, Free State) is a former South African cricketer who played two One Day Internationals in 1992. As of 2018 he was employed by Cricket South Africa as general manager of cricket.

Van Zyl previously coached the Gestetner Diamond Eagles and in 2010 he was appointed coach of the South Africa National cricket team, following the resignation of Mickey Arthur. He held the post until the end of the 2011 World Cup.

In October 2019, van Zyl was suspended from his position as interim director of Cricket South Africa along with the chief operating officer Naasei Appiah, and commercial manager Clive Eksteen for allegedly negligence of duty over the non-payment of commercial rights fees during 2018's Mzansi Super League.

References

External links
 

1961 births
Living people
South African cricketers
South Africa One Day International cricketers
Free State cricketers
Glamorgan cricketers
Cricketers from Bloemfontein
Coaches of the South Africa national cricket team
20th-century South African people
21st-century South African people